José Gudiol Ricart, or José Gudiol in citation (1904–1985) was a Spanish art historian, specializing in Catalan Romanesque painting, Gothic painting and other types of Spanish art.

Biography 
Josep Maria Gudiol i Ricart was born in 1904 in Vic, Catalonia, Spain. 

Gudiol Ricart published a series of monumental books surveying Spanish art history, the Ars Hispaniae series. The two most important works in the series were, Las Pinturas Murales Románicas de Cataluña (Gudiol and Pijoán, 1948) and Arquitectura y Escultura Románicas (Gudiol and Gaya Nuño, 1948).

He served as director of the Amatller Institute of Hispanic Art (Institut Amatller D'art Hispànic) in Barcelona, Spain.

Gudiol Ricart's daughter was painter, Montserrat Gudiol Corominas (1933–2015).

Publications

References 

1904 births
1985 deaths
People from Vic
Spanish art historians
Academics from Catalonia